Fortaleza Canyon is a canyon located in Serra Geral National Park in Cambará do Sul, Rio Grande do Sul, Brazil.

References

Canyons and gorges of Brazil
Landforms of Rio Grande do Sul